The Danzan Ryu lists differ in concept from the Kodokan Judo lists in that the techniques are taught in kata form in some applicable context, rather than
simply demonstrating and enumerating a single technique. Deashi Hayanada, for example, is not a single technique, but a combination of Deashi Harai (foot sweep) and Tenada Shime (cross arm bar). Emphasis on randori may vary greatly from one dojo to the next.

There are multiple romanizations, and many arts have more than one name. This article will attempt to represent the commonly used romanization variants. In addition, not all sources agree on the correct kanji (Japanese characters) for each technique or list. The alternative renderings are noted. The romanization was not agreed to until 1957. The earlier spellings are now archaic. Some kanji are also no longer common and not searchable (e.g. Danchu or Bitei).

The rank requirements for Danzan Ryu are not standardized, and may vary from dojo to dojo or even from instructor to instructor. Many of the techniques are considered Kuden – to be transmitted orally and never written down.

Each of the Okuden scrolls corresponds to a level of teaching license:

 Shinen-no-Maki was commemorated by the award of the Mokuroku, or catalogue scroll, listing the history of the art along with the Shoden and Chuden techniques. This is the basic instructor level and is equivalent to second-degree blackbelt.
 Shin'yō-no-Maki corresponds to the fully licensed instructor (Kyoshi) level and is equivalent to fourth – or fifth-degree blackbelt.
 Shinjin-no-Maki (post Pearl Harbor attack) was commemorated by the award of the Kaiden-no-Sho, or certificate of complete transmission (menkyo kaiden). This corresponds to the master instructor (Shihan / Professor) level of traditional jujutsu.

Yawara – Shoden level 
Hand Techniques/Gentle Arts, 20 Techniques
 Katate Hazushi Ichi – "Single Hand Escape #1" – escape from an outside hand grab 	
 Katate Hazushi Ni – "Single Hand Escape #2" – escape from an inside hand grab 	
 Ryōte Hazushi – "Both Hands Escape" – escape from a double wrist grab  	
 Morote Hazushi – "All Hands Escape or Multiple Hands Escape" – escape from two hands grabbing one wrist.	
 Yubi Tori Hazushi – "Digit (finger) Escape" – escape from a finger hold/grab		
 Momiji Hazushi " Maple leaf Escape" – escape from a front choke
 Ryo Eri Hazushi – "Both Lapel Escape" – escape from a double lapel grab 	
 Yubi Tori – "Digit (finger) Technique" – finger lock on the sensitive third finger	
 Moroyubi Tori – "All Digit (finger) Technique" – come-along all fingers hold 	
 Katate Tori – "Single Hand Technique" – one hand wrist lock	
 Ryōte Tori – "Both Hand Technique" – double wrist lock	
 Tekubi Tori Ichi – "Hand Neck (wrist) Technique One" – wrist lock from an outside hand grab	
 Tekubi Tori Ni – "Hand Neck (wrist) Technique Two" – thumb lock from an inside hand grab. 
 Imon Tori – "Clothing Seizure" – break hand from a chest push (衣紋捕)
 Ryōeri Tori – "Both Lapel Technique" – break and wrist lock from a two-handed lapel grab	
 Akushu Kote Tori – "Handshake Forearm (curling) technique" – wrist and thumb lock from a handshake	
 Akushu Ude Tori – "Handshake Arm technique" – arm bar from a handshake	
 Akushu Kotemaki Tori – "Handshake Forearm (curling) Rolling Technique" – arm bar and wrist lock from a handshake
 Kubi Nuki Shime – "Neck Hug Constriction" – escape from a side headlock	
 Hagai Shime – "Wing Constriction" – full nelson taken after avoiding a blow

Nage Te   –Shoden level 
also called Nage no Kata: Throwing Arts, 20 Techniques
 Deashi Harai – Advanced foot sweep	
 Sasae-ashi – Stopping leg
 Okuri Harai – Sending sweep	
 Soto Gama – Outside sickle
 Uchi Gama – Inside sickle	
 Soto Momo Harai – Outer thigh sweep	
 Uchi Momo Harai – Inner thigh sweep
 Ogoshi – Major hip 
 Utsuri Goshi – Changing hip throw
 Seoi Nage – Back carry throw	
 Ushiro Goshi – Rearward hip 
 Seoi Goshi – Back carry hip 	
 Tsurikomi Goshi – Lifting angle hip 
 Harai Goshi – Sweeping hip 
 Hane Goshi – Springing hip 
 Uki Otoshi – Floating drop
 Makikomi – Rolling angle
 Kane Sute – Crab sacrifice
 Tomoe Nage – Comma throw	
 Yama Arashi – Mountain Storm

Shime Te   –Shoden level 
also called Shime no Kata: Constriction Arts, 25 Techniques
 Eri Gatame – Collar Pin
 Kata Gatame – Shoulder Pin
 Juji Gatame – Cross Pin
 Shiho Gatame – Four corners Pin
 Sankaku Gatame – Three angle (triangle) Pin
 Ushiro Gatame – Rearward Pin
 Namijuji Shime – Normal Cross Constriction
 Gyakujuji Shime – Opposite Cross Constriction	
 Ichimonji Shime – Single line Constriction	
 Tsukkomi Shime – Thrusting angle Constriction	
 Hadaka Hime Ichi – Naked Constriction #1
 Hadaka Shime Ni – Naked Constriction #2
 Hadaka Shime San – Naked Constriction #3
 Dakikubi Shime – Embrace Neck Constriction
 Osaegami Shime – Grabbing Hair Constriction
 Kote Shime – Forearm (curling) Constriction
 Tenada Shime – Hand blade Constriction	
 Do Shime – Body Constriction {which causes Compressive asphyxia}	
 Ashi Garami Shime – Leg Entangle Constriction	
 Ashi Nada Shime – Leg Blade Constriction
 Ashi Yubi Shime – Leg Digit (toe) Constriction
 Momojime – Thigh Constriction	
 Shika no Issoku Shime – Foot of Deer Constriction
 Shidare Fuji Shime – Big toe Hanging wisteria Constriction	
 Tatsumaki Shime – Wind roll (Tornado) Constriction

Yonenbu no Kata – Shoden level 
Form for the Children's Section, 15 Techniques
 Deashi Harai or Deashibarai – advance foot sweep	
 Sasae-ashi – retard (stopping) leg	
 Okuriharai or Okuribarai – Sending sweep	
 Soto Gama – Outside sickle	
 Uchi Gama – Inside sickle	
 Soto Momo Harai or Sotomomobarai – Outer thigh sweep	
 Uchi Momo Harai or Uchimomobarai – Inner thigh sweep	
 O Goshi – Major hip throw		
 Seoinage – Back carry throw		
 Seoi Goshi – Back carry hip throw	
 Tsuri Komi Goshi – Lifting angle hip throw	
 Harai Goshi – Sweeping hip throw	
 Hane Goshi – Springing hip throw		
 Makikomi – rolling angle	
 Tomoe Nage – Swirl throw

Oku no Te – Chuden level 
also called Oku no Kata: Interior (secret) techniques, 25 Techniques
 Deashi Hayanada – Advancing Leg Quick combination blade	
 Ogoshi Hayanada – Major Loin Quick combination blade	
 Seoi Hayanada – Back-carry Quick combination blade
 Sumi Gaeshi – Corner Accepting reversal	
 Norimi – Riding the body		
 Mizu Kuguri – Underwater dive	
 Mae Yama Kage – Forward Mountain Shadow	
 Komi Iri – Swept along entry	
 Kote Gaeshi – Forearm (curling) accepting reversal	
 Sakanuki – Sloping draw	
 Gyakute Nage – Opposite hand throw
 Hon Tomoe – Together comma
 Katate Tomoe – Single hand comma
 Shigarami or Teshigarami – Arm entanglement	
 Gyakute Shigarami – Opposite hand arm entanglement
 Kote Shigarami – Forearm arm entanglement
 Ko Guruma – Minor wheel	
 Tora Nage – Tiger throw
 Tora Katsugi – Tiger Shoulder carry
 Arashi Otoshi – Storm drop	
 Hiki Otoshi – Pulling drop
 Kine Katsugi – Pestle shoulder carry	
 Kin Katsugi – Testicle shoulder carry
 Kazaguruma – Wind Wheel
 Jigoku Otoshi – Hell drop

Kiai no Maki – Chuden level 
Scroll of Spirit Yell, 24 Techniques –-( AJJF Board of Professors includes a number of additional techniques under this heading. See below)–
Includes weapons techniques, and a variety of oral teachings (kuden)
 Waribashi Ori – Split chopstick fold 
 Karatake Wari – Chinese bamboo split 
 Harage Ishi Wari – Abdomen lifting stone split 
 Shiraha Watari – Naked blade transit
Tessen No Maki
 Katate Hazushi – single hand escape
 Mune Dori – Chest Dynamic technique
 Miken Wari – Forehead split
 Uchikomi Dome – Stop a strike
 Katate Ori – Single-hand fold
 Katsura Wari – Judas tree split
Tanto No Maki
 Hibara Hazushi – Flank escape
 Katate Hazushi – Single-hand escape
 Tsukkomi Hazushi – Thrust escape
 Ryote Dome – Stop with both hands
Daito No Maki
 Ryote Dome- Both Hand Immediate Stop
 Nukimi Dome – Stop a draw
 Shiraha Dori – Naked blade hold
 Suso Harai or Susobarai – Hem sweep
Bo No Maki
 Hanbo Uchikomi Dori – Hold from strike with a 3 ft staff
 Rokushaku Bo Furi – Six-foot staff swing
 Mune Gatame – Chest pin
 Shiho Gatame – Four direction pin
 Futari Shime or Ninin Shime or Nininjime – two-man constriction
 Furo Shime or Furojime – Bathtub strangle
 Shichinin Shime or Shichininjime – seven-man constriction
Tanju No Maki
 Gan Hazushi or Me Hazushi – Face or Eye escape
 Mune Hazushi – Chest Escape
 Hibara Hazushi – Flank escape
The following were added to Tanju no Maki by AJJF:
 Ushiro Hazushi Ichi – Rear Escape #1
 Ushiro Hazushi Ni – Rear Escape #2
 Mawari Hazushi – Turning Escape

Further additions to Kiai No Maki by AJJF in 1976 included the following additional techniques:

Keri Te
 Tombogeri – Dragonfly kick
 Kin Geri – Testicle Kick – (In the AJJF Kin Geri is the terminology used, even though the three kicks in the curriculum target the knee, groin, and solar plexus with a front kick)
 Yoko Geri – Side kick
 Mawashi Geri – Roundhouse Kick
 Ryo-ashi Geri – Double foot kick
 Mae Tobi Geri – Front flying kick
Uke Te
 Jodan Uke – Upper-level Block
 Nagashi Uke – Flowing Block
 Shuto Uke – Knife Hand Block
 Gedan Uke – Lower-level Block
Atemi
 Atemi Ichi – Strike One (Side of jaw)
 Atemi Ni – Strike Two (Upward palm strike to chin)
 Atemi San – Strike Three (Upward palm strike to nose)
 Atemi Yon – Strike Four (Side of head above ear)
 Kasumi Dori – Seized by Haze (grazing knife-hand/forearm strike to side of neck)
 Hibara Uchi – Flank Strike (elbow to floating ribs/liver)
 Sui Getsu – Moon in the Water (Uppercut to solar plexus)
 Hon Getsu – True Moon (downward punch to bladder)
 Kin Geri – Testicle Kick (knee to groin)
Hanbo no Maki
 Ganseki Otoshi Garami – Stone-drop Entanglement
 Oni Kudaki – Demon Smash
 Ashi Kujiki – Leg Crush
 Ashi Gatame – Leg Pin
 Bo Gaeshi _ Staff Reversal
 Koku – Empty

Goshinjutsu – Chuden level 
Self-Defense Techniques: 28 techniques added by the AJJF Board of Professors, and modified periodically by them. Other DZR groups may not recognize this as a separate list, but instead may practice these techniques as common variations of techniques found in other lists.
Formerly called Jokyu Yawara, Advanced Yawara, or Ladies' Yawara.
Based on the original Fujin Goshin no Maki.
 Kata Eri Hazushi – Single collar escape 
 Katate Tori Ni – Single hand Technique #2 
 Katate Tori San – Single hand Technique #3 
 Katate Tori Shi – Single hand Technique #4 
 Imon Tori Ni –  Insignia Technique #2 
 Kata Mune Dori – Single chest Technique 
 Ude Tori – Arm Technique
 Genkotsu Ude Tori – Gripping with the fist arm technique 
 Ude Gyaku Ichi – Arm opposite #1
 Ude Gyaku Ni – Arm opposite #2
 Ninen Yubi Tori – Second Man Digit (finger) Technique (formerly called Ninin Kotegarami)
 Kata Eri Tori – Single Collar Technique
 Ushiro Gyaku – Rearward Opposite
 Kata Hagai – Single wing 
 Tekubi Shigarami – Wrist Shoulder entanglement 
 Genkotsu Otoshi – Gripping with the fist drop 
 Hongyaku Ichi – Basic Opposite #1 
 Hongyaku Ni – Basic Opposite #2
 Ushiro Daki Nage – Rear Embrace throw 
 Mae Daki Nage Ichi – Front Embrace throw #1 
 Mae Daki Nage Ni – Front Embrace throw #2 
 Kata Guruma – Shoulder wheel 
 Hiza Garami – Knee entanglement   (formerly called Hiki-otoshi Ichi)
 Mae Osaegami Nage – Forward Gripping Hair Throw 
 Ushiro Osaegami Nage – Rear Gripping Hair Throw 
 Kesa Nage – Across the Shoulder (as a scarf) Throw 
 Ashi Garami-Leg Entanglement
 Sannen Nage – Third Man throw (called Sannin Hazushi by Prof. Law and listed in his Shinin Notes; previously included by AJJF in Shinin no Maki with same name as noted below)

Fujin Goshin no Maki – Chuden level 
Women's Self Defense Scroll, 35 Techniques

1. Katate Hazushi Ichi – Single hand Escape #1.
2. Katate Hazushi Ni – Single hand Escape #2.
3. Morote Hazushi – Many hand Escape.
4. Ryote Hazushi – Double hand Escape.
5. Kata Eri Hazushi – Single Collar Escape.
6. Ryo Eri Hazushi – Double Collar Escape.
7. Momiji Hazushi Ichi – Maple tree Escape #1.
8. Momiji Hazushi Ni – Maple tree Escape #2.
9. Momiji Hazushi San – Maple tree Escape #3.
10. Ushiro Daki Nage – Rear Embrace Throw.
11. Mae Daki Nage Ichi – Front Embrace Throw #1.
12. Mae Daki Nage Ni – Front Embrace Throw #2.
13. Mae Daki Hazushi –  Front Embrace Escape.
14. Ninin Hazushi – Second Man Escape.
15. Genkotsu Otoshi – Gripping with the Fist Drop.
16. Osaegami Nage – Grabbing Hair Throw.
17. Akushu Kote Tori – Handshake Forearm (curling) Technique.
18. Akushu Ude Tori – Handshake Arm-lock.
19. Akushu Kotemaki Tori – Handshake Forearm-winding Technique.
20. Katate Tori Ichi – Single hand Technique #1.
21. Katate Tori Ni – Single hand Technique #2.
22. Imon tori – Insignia Technique.
23. Daki kubi Tori – Embrace head Technique.
24. Yubi Tori Hazushi – Digit (finger) Technique Escape.
25. Yubi Tori – Digit (finger) Technique.
26. Moro Yubi Tori – Many Digit (finger) Technique.
27. Ryote Tori – Both Hand Technique.
28. Tekubi Tori – Wrist Technique.
29. Hagai Tori – Wing Technique.
30. Shoto Hibara Hazushi – Knife Spleen Escape.
31. Shoto Kata Hazushi – Knife Shoulder Escape.
32. Shoto Tsukkomi Hazushi – Knife Thrusting Angle Escape.
33. Tanju Mune Hazushi – Pistol Chest Escape.
34. Tanju Gan Hazushi – Pistol Eye Escape.
35. Tanju Hibara Hazushi – Pistol Spleen Escape.

Fusegi Jutsu – Chuden level 
Self Defense Techniques

 Katate Hazushi Ichi - "Single Hand Escape one"- Escape and hold from outside wrist grip
 Kata Te Hazushi Ni - "Single Hand Escape two"- Escape and hold from an inside wrist grip
 Momiji Hazushi - "Maple leaf Escape" - 	Double arm break from front strangle
 Moro Te Hazushi - "Many Hand Escape" - Double arm break from front strangle
 Imon Tori - "Insignia Techniques"- Knee takedown from chest push
 Akushu Ude Hazushi and Tori - "Handshake Arm Escape and Technique"- Escape and leg kick from armbar
 Akushu Kote Hazushi and Tori Ichi - "Handshake Forearm Curling Escape and Technique one" - 	Backward thumb flex from handshake
 Akushu Kote Hazushi and Tori Ni - "Handshake Forearm Curling Escape and Technique two" - Forward thumb flex from handshake
 Akushu Kote Hazushi and Tori San - "Handshake Forearm Curling Escape and Technique three" - Thumb control from handshake
 Hagai Shime Hazushi - "Pinion Constriction Escape" - Escape from full nelson
 Ushiro Daki Nage - "Rearward Hug Throw" - Seoi Nage, strike from rear bear hug
 Mae Daki Nage Ichi - "Forward Hug Throw one" - Nerve escape from front bear hug, arms free
 Mae Daki Nage Ni - "Forward Hug Throw two" - Head butt, knee strike from front bear hug, arms pinned
 Genkotsu Otoshi - "Gripping with the Fist Drop" - Dakikubi from a double punch
 Kata Gatame Ichi - "Shoulder Pin one" - Shoulder lock taking head to mat from punch
 Kata Gatame Ni - "Shoulder Pin two" - Kotemaki Tori from an overhead club, finish with O Soto Gari
 Kabe Shime - "Wall Constriction" - Ichi Monji against a wall
 Genkotsu Ude Tori - "Gripping with the Fist Arm Technique" - Wrap arm, strike, sweep and bar on ground from punch
 Genkotsu Gyaku - "Gripping with the Fist Opposite" - Wrap arm, hammerlock and choke
 Ude Tori - "Arm Technique" - Arm bar on your shoulder from punch
 Akushu Ude Nage - "Handshake Arm Throw" - Arm break, whip from handshake
 Ogoshi Ude Tori - "Great Hip Arm Technique" - Throw O Goshi, sit and break arm
 Ude Hazushi Ogoshi - "Arm Escape Great Hip" - Throw O Goshi from armbar across waist
 Genkotsu Komi Iri - "Gripping with the Fist Swept Along Entry" - 	Legbar takedown, apply Komi Iri
 Hadaka Shime Ni and Hazushi - "Naked Constriciton two and Escape" - Choke from Seoi Nage, drop on head
 Club take away - Throw Makikomi, break arm from overhead club strike

Keisatsu Gijutsu – Chuden level 
also called Keisatsu Torite: Police Arrest Techniques 

 Katate Hazushi Ichi – "Single Hand Escape #1" – escape from an outside hand grab 
 Katate Hazushi Ni – "Single Hand Escape #2" – escape from an inside hand grab 
 Ryōte Hazushi – "Both Hands Escape" – escape from a double wrist grab
 Morote Hazushi – "Many Hands Escape or Multiple Hands Escape" – escape from two hands grabbing one wrist	
 Momiji Hazushi " Maple leaf Escape" – escape from a front choke
 Ryōeri Hazushi – "Both Lapel Escape" – escape from a double lapel grab
 Yubi Tori Hazushi – "Digit (finger) Escape" – escape from a finger hold/grab
 Yubi Tori – "Digit (finger) Technique" – finger lock on the sensitive third finger	
 Moro Yubi Tori – "Many Digit (finger) Technique" – come-along all fingers hold 	
 Katate Tori – "Single Hand Technique" – one hand wrist lock	
 Ryōte Tori – "Both Hand Technique" – double wrist lock	
 Akushu Kote Tori – "Handshake Forearm (curling) technique" – wrist and thumb lock from a handshake	
 Akushu Ude Tori – "Handshake Arm technique" – arm bar from a handshake	
 Akushu Kotemaki Tori – "Handshake Forearm (curling) Rolling Technique" – arm bar and wrist lock from a handshake
 Imon Tori – "Insignia Technique" – break hand from a chest push
 Tekubi Tori Ichi – "Hand Neck (wrist) Technique One" – wrist lock from an outside hand grab	
 Tekubi Tori Ni – "Hand Neck (wrist) Technique Two" – thumb lock from an inside hand grab 
 Ryōeri Tori – "Both Lapel Technique" – break and wrist lock from a two-handed lapel grab	
 Kubi Nuki Shime – "Neck Hug Constriction" – escape from a side headlock	
 Hagai Shime – "Wing Constriction" – full nelson taken after avoiding a blow
 Kata Mune Tori Ni - "Shoulder Chest Technique Two"- Lapel grab and punch defense
 Genkotsu Ude Tori Ni - "Gripping with the Fist Arm Technique Two"- Armbar from a punch
 Ude Gyaku San - "Arm Opposite Three"- Shoulder and neck hold from front
 Ude Gyaku Shi - "Arm Opposite Four"- Shoulder and neck hold from rear
 Ninnen Kote Garami - "Second man Forearm (curling) Entanglement"- Two man come-along hold
 Sunnen Kote Garami - "Third man Forearm (curling) Entanglement"- Three man come-along hold
 Kataeri Tori Ni - "Single Collar Technique Two"- Armbar from lapel hold
 Ushiro Gyaku Ni - "Rearward Opposite Two"- Extended rear armbar
 Mae Gyaku- "Front Opposite"- Extended front armbar
 Kote Shigarami - "Forearm (curling) Arm Entanglement"- Punch to Kotemaki pin with one hand
 Kote Gyaku - "Forearm (curling) Opposite"- Reverse arm dislocation
 Kata Hagai - "Shoulder Wing"- Standing Kata Gatame
 Tekubi Shigarami Ni - "Hand-neck (wrist) Arm Entanglement Two- Wrist come-along hold
 Genkotsu Otoshi Ni - "Gripping with the fist Drop Two"- Punch takedown art, fist drop
 Hung Gyaku Ni - Arm-swing from a punch
 Ushiro Daki Nage Ni - "Rearward Embrace Throw Two"- Throw from a rear bear hug
 Ushiro Daki Nage San - "Rearward Embrace Throw Three"- Throw from a rear bear hug
 Mae Daki Nage Ni - "Forward Embrace Throw Two"- Throw from a front bear hug
 Kata Guruma - "Shoulder Wheel"- Punch to figure four and pile driver
 Hiki Otoshi - "Pulling Drop"- Throw and lock arm in leg
 Gyaku Shigarami - "Opposite Arm Entanglement"- Throw and hold with one foot
 Ushiro Nage - "Rearward Throw"- A rear throw
 Osaegami Nage Ni - "Grabbing Hair Throw Two"- Takedown (Imon Tori) from hair grab
 Kasumi Dori - "Three in a row Dynamic technique"- Block punch and hit side of neck
 Atemi Ichi - "Strike the body One"- Block punch and hit side of jaw
 Atemi Ni - "Strike the body Two" -Block punch and hit side of chin
 Atemi San - "Strike the body Three"- Block punch and hit side of nose
 Atemi Shi - "Strike the body Four"- Block punch and hit side of head
 Ken Keri - "Sword Kick"- Block punch and knee to groin
 Hibara Uchi - "Spleen Inside"- Block punch and hit armpit
 Sui Getsu - "Water Moon"- Solar plexus blow
 Denko - "Electrical flash"- Combination of blows
 Hon Getsu - "Together Moon"- Naval Blow
 Momo Shime- "Thigh Constriction"- Nerve at thigh
 Yubi Tori Shime Ichi - "Digit (finger) Technique Constriction One"- Nerve and thumb and index finger
 Yubi Tori Shime Ni - "Digit (finger) Technique Constriction Two"- Nerve and thumb and index finger base, palm
 Kesuri Yubi - Nerve between middle and ring finger
 Kosi Katari - Nerve between ring and little finger
 Tekubi Ichi - "Hand neck (wrist) One"- Nerve at wrist, anterior of arm
 Tekubi Ni - "Hand neck (wrist) Two"- Nerve at wrist, posterior
 Ude Ori - "Arm Weaving"- Nerve above wrist, arm-break
 Ninode Tori - Nerve above elbow
 Kata Tori - "Shoulder Technique"- Nerve at shoulder
 Ude Tori Shime - "Arm Technique Constriction"- Nerve in arm near elbow
 Keri Age - "Kick Rising"- Nerve at calf
 Sumi Age - "Corner Rising"- Nerve at shin
 Do Mike - "Torso Body Scarf"- Nerve at side of neck
 Mune - "Chest"- Nerve at front of neck
 Kubi - "Neck"- Nerve at chin
 Ni - "Two"- Nerve at eyelids
 Kata - "Shoulder"- Nerve at shoulder
 So - "Thought"- Nerve at shoulder blade
 Konbou Katate Ori - "Club Single hand Weaving"- Club arm hold
 Konbou Mune Dori - "Club Chest Dynamic technique"- Collarbone breaking art
 Konbou Kata Uchi - "Club Shoulder Inside"- Hit nerve at side of neck
 Konbou Kau Tori - Club hand hold
 Konbou Sui Getsu Otoshi - "Club Water Moon Drop"- Drop uke with solar plexus blow
 Konbou Ude Ori - "Club Arm Weaving"- Club arm break
 Konbou Waki Uchi Dori - "Club Armpit Inside Dynamic technique"- Side paralyzing art
 Konbou Sui Getsu Kin - "Club Water Moon Groin"- Solar plexus and groin blow
 Konbou Kasumi Dori - "Club Three in a row Dynamic technique"- Club takedown art
 Konbou Uchikomi Hiza Nage - Club Inside Angle Knee Throw"- Miss swing for head, Hiza nage, leg lock
 Tanto Hibara Hazushi - "Knife Spleen Escape"- Side slash escape
 Tanto Kata Hazushi - "Knife Shoulder Escape"- Overhead stab escape
 Tanto Tsukkomi Hazushi Ichi - "Knife Thrusting Angle Escape One"- Thrusting stab escape 1
 Tanto Tsukkomi Hazushi Ni - "Knife Thrusting Angle Escape Two"- Thrusting stab escape 2
 Tanto Ryote Hazushi - "Knife Both hands Escape"- Upward stab escape
 Tanju Kata Hazushi - "Pistol Shoulder Escape"- Shoulder level escape
 Tanju Mi Hazushi - "Pistol Body Escape"- Eye level escape
 Tanju Hibara Hazushi - "Pistol Spleen Escape"- Side escape
 Tanju Ushiro Hazushi - "Pistol Rearward Escape"- Rear escape
 Bin Kata Hazushi - "Bottle Shoulder Escape"- Bottle overhead strike
 Bin Hibara Hazushi - "Bottle Spleen Escape"- Bottle side swing
 Bin Tsukkomi Hazushi- Bottle Thrusting Angle Escape"- Bottle straight jab
 Fuetsu Kata Hazushi Ni - "Axe Shoulder Escape Two"- Axe overhead strike
 Fuetsu Hibara Hazushi Ni - "Axe Spleen Escape Two"- Axe side swing
 Fuetsu Sune Harai Hazushi - "Axe Shin Sweep Escape"- Axe leg cut

Shinen no Maki – Okuden level 
Scroll of the Spirit Man. The AJJF at one time included an additional (36th) technique (Sannin Hazushi), but no longer does so. It is now included in Goshinjutsu (see above).
 Isami Tsuki Nage – Forward entering Thrusting Throw
 Obi Hane Goshi – Belt Springing Hip
 Tsurikomi Taoshi – Lifting Angle Throwdown
 Momiji Nage – Maple leaf Throw
 Gyaku Hayanada – Opposite Quick combination blade
 Hiza Nage – Knee Throw
 Osaekomi Gyakute Tori – Gripping angle opposite hand Technique
 Kobushi Shime – Fist Constriction
 Kesa Hazushi – Across the shoulders (as a scarf) Escape
 Kubi Shime Tomoe Gyakute – Neck Constriction Comma Opposite hand
 Ninin Nage – Second person Throw
 Gyakute Gaeshi – Reverse hand Accepting technique
 Hiza Ori Nage – Knee Weaving Throw
 Gyaku Hagai – Opposite Wing
 Ushiro Kan Nuki – Rearward Rigid Embrace
 Mae Kan Nuki – Forward Rigid Embrace
 Hikitate Tori Shime –  Measure (from head to floor in seiza) Technique Constriction
 Ude Garami – Arm Entanglement
 Ebi Shime – Shrimp Constriction
 Ushiro Ebi Shime – Rearward Shrimp Constriction
 Gyaku Eri – Opposite Collar
 Ushiro Nage – Rearward Throw
 Ude Shigarami Shime – Arm Shoulder Entanglement Constriction
 Ashi Kan Nuki – Leg Rigid Embrace
 Kesa Koroshi – Across the shoulders (as a scarf) Killing
 Handou Shime – Quick reaction Constriction
 Ashi Gyaku –  Leg Opposite
 Kabe Shime – Wall Constriction
 Ashi Karami Tori – Leg Entanglement Constriction
 Nidan Gaeshi – Two Level Accepting reversal 
 Satsuma Shime – Pillar (or police) Constriction
 Tataki Komi – Striking Angle
 Ushiro Nage Tori – Rearward Throw Technique
 Saru Shigarami – Monkey Shoulder Entanglement
 Sandan Gaeshi – Three Level Accepting reversal

Shinyo no Maki – Okuden level 
Scroll of the Yang Spirit
 Gyaku Hizaguruma – Opposite Knee Wheel
 Tsuki Hazushi Kotemaki – Thrusting Escape Forearm rolling
 Tsukkomi Dome and Gaeshi – Thrusting Angle Immediate stop and Accepting reversal
 Sune Shime – Lower leg Constriction 
 Saru Shime – Monkey Constriction
 Tobi Tsuki Tenada – Flying Thrusting Hand blade
 Obi Otoshi – Belt Drop
 Sennin Kage – Sailor Shadow
 Mune Dori – Chest Dynamic technique
 Tsurigane Otoshi – Swallow Drop
 Inazuma – Lightning
 Denkō – Electrical flash
 Kasumi Dori – Three in a row Dynamic technique
 Shishi Otoshi – Lion Drop
 Tawara Gaeshi – Rice bale Accepting reversal
 Tonbo Gaeshi – Dragonfly Accepting reversal
 Keri Komi – Kicking Angle
 Ryuko – Dragon & Lion
 Haya nawa – Quick combination Rope
 Katate Tai Atari – Single hand Body Strike
 Tsuki mi – Thrusting Body
 Atemi – Strike the Body
 Zozu Kurawase – Literally: Elephant to deal a Blow
 Tora Nirami – Tiger Stare
 Kiai Dori – Fighting spirit (shouting) Dynamic technique
 Senryu Tomoe – Stopping technique Comma
 Yuki Chigai – Going along different paths
 Munen Muso or Munen Musow – No thought, no conceptions

Shingen no Maki – Okuden level 
Scroll of the Original Mind.
 Ten To or Tento
 Riyo Mou or Ryomo
 Kasumi
 Cho Tou or Choto
 Jin Chiu or Jinchu
 Matsukaze
 Gebi
 Murasame
 Shichu or Hichu
 Danchu
 Kyosen aka Kyoto
 Suigetsu
 Myo Sho
 Kiyoin or Kyoin
 Tsukikage 
 Inatsuma or Inazuma
 Hoka (Soto) Shiyaku Zawa
 Uchi Shiyaku Zawa
 Yakou or Yako
 Sen Riyu or Senryu 
 Uchi Kibisu
 Kouri or Kori
 In Nou or Inno
 Doku Ko or Dokko
 Kaychiu or Keichu
 Mikazuki
 Kyoin aka Waki Kage
 Wan Sho
 Kyo Shin
 Haya Uchi
 Gan Ka
 Sori or Kusanagi
 Do Ko
 Katsu Satsu or Kassatsu
 Myo Jo

Kappō – Koden level 
Resuscitation Techniques, 11 Techniques originally taught by Professor Okazaki and later augmented in 1969 by Robert Reish to 35 techniques.

The original 11 techniques include:

 Hon Katsu (basic restoration)
 Ura Katsu (reverse restoration)
 Tanden Katsu (abdomen restoration)
 Nodo Katsu (mental depression restoration)
 Dekishi Katsu (drowning restoration)
 Hanaji Tome (nosebleed stop restoration)
 Kin Katsu (testicle blow restoration)
 Se Katsu (main restoration)
 Ashi Katsu (foot restoration)
 Kubi Kappō (hanging restoration)
 No Kappō (head restoration)

Note that the names of the 11 "original" techniques varied between different students of Professor Okazaki.  The above names are the most commonly used.

Seifukujutsu – Betsuden level 
Restoration Therapy 52 Techniques and Long-Life Massage

Taught as a separate tradition (betsuden) even to non-practitioners of Danzan Ryu.

Curriculum Order

The Yawara list is almost always taught as the first list in a curriculum, given its overall usefulness.
The first seven techniques, consisting of escapes from simple grips, were once referred to as Te Hodoki (untying of hands), and were the first things taught to a prospective student. While learning the Te Hodoki, the individual's character was observed and assessed, and the teacher would decide whether or not to accept him as a student.
Yawara instruction is usually integrated with instruction in breakfalls (sutemi/ukemi), and (once the student can fall safely) with the first techniques of the Nage Te list.
Following this comes the rest of Nage Te, Shime Te, Goshinjutsu (Jokyu Yawara) and Oku-no-Te, by the time a student is roughly brown belt.
The Kiai no Maki Techniques are generally taught as the student approaches the black belt level, in addition to some or all of Shinin-no-Maki.
Shin'yō-no-Maki and Shinjin-no-Maki are not introduced until after the black belt has been attained, in most schools.
Seifukujutsu, Kappo, meditation techniques, Randori, massage, first aid, and nerve strikes may also be integrated into the curriculum at varying levels, depending on the instructor.

References

External links

Jujutsu
Lists of judo techniques